Elmārs Rubīns (born 12 December 1944) is a Soviet rower from Latvia.

Rubīns was born in Daugavpils, Latvia. At the 1965 European Rowing Championships in Duisburg, he won silver with the men's eight. At the 1966 World Rowing Championships in Bled, he won silver with the men's eight. He competed at the 1968 Summer Olympics in Mexico City with the men's coxless four where they came eleventh.

References

1944 births
Living people
Soviet male rowers
Olympic rowers of the Soviet Union
Rowers at the 1968 Summer Olympics
Sportspeople from Daugavpils
European Rowing Championships medalists
World Rowing Championships medalists for the Soviet Union